Aleksandar Kesić (Serbian Cyrillic: Александар Кесић; born 18 August 1987) is a Serbian professional footballer who plays as a goalkeeper.

Club career
During his footballing career, Kesić played for Mladost Apatin, Vojvodina, Rad, Radnički Niš and Spartak Subotica in the Serbian SuperLiga. He had previously gained experience at Big Bull Bačinci and Palić in the Serbian League Vojvodina.

International career
Kesić represented Serbia at the 2007 UEFA European Under-21 Championship. He played one match during the tournament, in a 2–0 loss against England in Group B. However, Serbia progressed to the semi-finals and later went on to finish as runners-up of the competition.

Notes

References

External links
 
 
 

Association football goalkeepers
FK Mladost Apatin players
FK Palić players
FK Rad players
FK Radnički Niš players
FK Spartak Subotica players
FK Vojvodina players
People from Apatin
Serbia and Montenegro footballers
Serbia under-21 international footballers
Serbian First League players
Serbian footballers
Serbian SuperLiga players
1987 births
Living people